Eliezer Yehuda Waldenberg (December 10, 1915 – November 21, 2006) was a rabbi, posek, and dayan in Jerusalem. He is known as a leading authority on medicine and Jewish law and referred to as the Tzitz Eliezer after his 21-volume  halachic treatise covering a wide breadth of halacha, including Jewish medical ethics, and daily ritual issues from Shabbat to kashrut.

Biography
Waldenberg was born in Jerusalem in 1915 to Rabbi Yaakov Gedalya who immigrated from Kovno, Lithuania to pre-Mandatory Palestine in the early 1900s. He studied in the Etz Chaim Yeshiva and was a student of the rosh yeshiva, Rav Isser Zalman Meltzer. Waldenberg wrote his first book, Dvar Eliezer, at age 19 in 1934.

For many years, Waldenberg served as a community rabbi at a small synagogue on Jaffa Road adjacent to the Shaare Tzedek Hospital. Many doctors prayed at the synagogue and brought their questions to the rabbi. Waldenberg began to answer their questions about Jewish law and its application to medical ethics, and would come to teach a weekly medical ethics class to the hospital's doctors and nurses.
He was close to Rabbi Ben Zion Meir Hai Uziel, and was the head of the Shaarei Zion Yeshiva, founded by him.

In 1957, Waldenberg became president of the District Rabbinical Court in Jerusalem,. He was later appointed to the Beit Din Hagadol in Jerusalem where he sat with Rav Yosef Shalom Elyashiv.

In 1976, Waldenberg was awarded the Israel Prize for Rabbinical studies.

Waldenberg died on 21 November 2006 at Shaarei Zedek Medical Center in Jerusalem and was buried later the same day at Jerusalem's Har HaMenuchot cemetery.

Medical opinions

His major work Tzitz Eliezer is an encyclopedic treatise on halachic questions, viewed as one of the great achievements of halachic scholarship of the 20th century. Though he wrote numerous books and articles in all fields of halacha, he was best known for his decisions on medical dilemmas. He addresses in his volumes complex medical questions including fertility, abortion, organ transplantation, euthanasia,  sex reassignment surgery, autopsies, smoking, cosmetic surgery, and medical experimentation. His halachic opinions are valued by rabbis across the religious spectrum.

Waldenberg forbade performing elective surgery on someone who is neither sick nor in pain, such as cosmetic surgery. He argues that such activities are outside the boundaries of the physician's mandate to heal. Notably, Rabbi Moshe Feinstein disagreed with this opinion.

He allowed first trimester abortion of a fetus which would be born with a deformity that would cause it to suffer, and termination of a fetus with a lethal fetal defect such as Tay–Sachs disease up to the end of the second trimester of gestation.

He ruled that a child conceived outside the womb, through in vitro fertilization, has no parents and bears no halachic relationship either to the biological parents or the "surrogate mother," the woman who carries the child to term.

He was one of a small but growing number of rabbis to forbid smoking.

Many of his medical opinions were recorded by his student Avraham Steinberg, and then translated into summary volumes.

In the chapter entitled "On the treatment which exposes the physician to danger," Waldenberg wrote:

Waldenberg ruled sex reassignment surgery to be permissible in the case of a baby born androgynous where one set of organs were more developed. After careful halachic and medical consideration, Waldenberg ruled that a transsexual woman following sex reassignment surgery is a halachic woman. He wrote, "The external anatomy which is visible is what determines the halakha" in the present tense.

Kevod habriyot
Waldenberg permitted hearing Torah reading, Shofar blowing and Megillah reading by means of a loudspeaker, telephone, or radio, if no other options were available. (Responsa Tzitz Eliezer, 8:11.). However Rabbi Shlomo Zalman Auerbach strongly disagreed on this. (see Minchas Shlomo I:9). Waldenberg held that voices replicated by electronic devices generally have the status of noise from musical instruments, rather than that of actual voices.

He also emphasized the Jewish concept of Kevod HaBriyot (human honor or dignity) in his rulings. As an example, Waldenberg adduced this concept in support of his ruling that a deaf person can use an electric hearing aid on Shabbat. Waldenberg wrote:

Jewish law, the State of Israel and the IDF

Waldenberg also wrote a multivolume set on the practical issues of government called Hilkhot Medinah. In this work he takes issue with many positions of former chief rabbis Yitzhak HaLevi Herzog, Shlomo Goren, and Isser Yehuda Unterman.

He writes in support of yeshiva students' exemption from military service because through the merit of their Torah learning they help protect the country.

He granted workers the right to strike when employers have violated a workplace condition that has become “the custom of the land.” Most legal authorities required workers to bring their employer to a beit din (religious court) before resorting to a strike.
"In situations such as these, in which the worker is absolutely certain that the employer has transgressed and violated a condition that has been established as the custom of the land, the worker may take the law into his own hands by levying the fine that the appointed communal leaders have deemed appropriate for a situation such as this."

Even though "a convert may not hold a position of Jewish communal authority," Waldenberg ruled that a convert may not serve in a lone communal position but he may serve on a communal committee.

Works
 
 הלכות מדינה [Hilchos Medinah] (in Hebrew) on legal issues of the political state in three-volumes
Divrei Eliezer, novella
Shvisas Hayam on ships, maritime law, and Shabbos

References

Further reading 
Fred Rosner, Pioneers in Jewish Medical Ethics, Jason Aronson Publishers, 1997. 
Jewish Medical Law:  A Concise Response.  Compiled & Edited from the Tzitz Eliezer by Avraham Steinberg; translated by David B. Simons, MD.  Jerusalem:  Gefen Publishing, 1992.
A. Steinberg, Encyclopedia of Jewish Medical Ethics: a Compilation of Jewish Medical Law on All Topics of Medical Interest
Judaism and Gender Issues Essay Summarizing responsa of the Tzitz Eliezar on transsexuality
Cosmetic Surgery – A review of four classic Teshuvot (Rabbi Waldenberg is #2)

External links
Find A Grave: Rabbi Eliezer Yehuda “Tzitz Eliezer” Waldenberg 
Geni.com: Rabbi Eliezer Yehuda Waldenberg

Haredi rabbis in Israel
1915 births
2006 deaths
Israel Prize in Rabbinical literature recipients
Israel Prize Rabbi recipients
Jewish medical ethics
Rabbis in Jerusalem
Haredi rabbis in Mandatory Palestine
People from Jerusalem
Burials at Har HaMenuchot